The article contains information about the 2012–13 Iran 3rd Division football season. This is the 4th rated football league in Iran after the Persian Gulf Cup, Azadegan League, and 2nd Division. The league started from September 2012.

In total and in the first round, 70 teams will compete in 9 different groups. From the First Round, 18 teams go through the Second Round. In the Second Round 18 teams will be divided in three groups of 6, where the winner of each group will be directly promoted to 2013–14 Iran Football's 2nd Division. The three group runner-up and the best third place team will go through play-off matches, where the two play-off winners also will be promoted. Therefore, in total, five team will be promoted from this league to Iran Football's 2nd Division.

Teams
The following 70 teams will compete in 2012–13 Iran Football's 3rd Division season.

Aria Khorramdarreh Zanjan
Arman Reza Mashhad
Bahman Ilam
Bahman Shiraz
Behineh Rahbar Abadeh
Daam & Toyour Ravansar
Danial Shomal Fuman
Esteghlal Darband Khomein
Esteghlal Javan Babakan
Esteghlal Jonub Tehran
Esteghlal Rey
Etehad Aleshtar Lorestan
Fajr Nikan Tehran
Fajr Rafsanjan
Helal Ahmar Gerash
Hemat Gonbad
Heyat Football Babol
Homa Bandar Deylam
Homa Qom
Isar Jiroft
Kargar Boneh Gez
Karoun Ahvaz
Khazar Mahmoudabad
Khalkhal Dasht Ardebil          
Mahtab Baft Shafagh
Mehr Hamedan
Mes Novin Kerman
Mes Shahr-e Babak
Mostafalou Tabriz
Nabard Shahrekord
Naftoon Tehran
Oghab Tehran
Omid Hassanabad
Omid Kish
Pars Football Chaloos
Payam Sanat Amol
Persepolis Novin Tehran
Pershiaan Zanjan
Persian Mahram Qazvin
Piroozi Garmsar
Piroozi Shirvan
Rahian Velayat Tehran
Safahan Isfahan
Sedaghat Astara
Sepahan Novin
Sepidrood Astaneh 
Shahin Kuhrang Shahrekord                   
Shahrdari Behshahr
Shahrdari Dizicheh
Shahrdari Eslamshahr
Shahrdari Gachsaran
Shahrdari Jouybar
Shahrdari Kamyaran
Shahrdari Mahabad
Shahrdari Mahshahr
Shahrdari Mamasani
Shahrdari Nazarabad
Shahrdari Naghadeh
Shahrdari Konarak
Shahrdari Novin Bandar Abbas
Shahrdari Qorveh
Shahrdari Quchan
Shamoushak Noshahr
Siman Behbahan
Sorkhpooshan Khorramabad
Tose'eh & Omran Ferdows
Tohid Bushehr
Vahdat Khavaran Birjand
Zob Ahan Novin
Zoratkaran Parsabad

First Round (standings)

Group 1

Group 2

Group 3

Group 4

Group 5

Group 6

Group 7

Group 8

Group 9

Second Round (standings)

Group A

Group B

Group C

Play-off

References 

 https://web.archive.org/web/20130109014740/http://www.mazandsport.com/jadval/lige3

External links
 آیین نامه مسابقات
 اخبار فوتبال

League 3 (Iran) seasons
4